The 1988 South American Artistic Gymnastics Championships were held in Rosario, Argentina, October 1988. It was the sixth edition of the South American Artistic Gymnastics Championships.

Participating nations

Medalists

References

1988 in gymnastics
South American Gymnastics Championships
International gymnastics competitions hosted by Argentina
1988 in Argentine sport